

See also
 List of journalists killed in Bangladesh
 Attacks on RTI activists in India

References

External links
CPJ

Journalists killed
 
India